The 2018–19 Navy Midshipmen women's basketball team represents the United States Naval Academy during the 2018–19 NCAA Division I women's basketball season. The Midshipmen, led by eleventh year head coach Stefanie Pemper, play their home games at Alumni Hall and were members of the Patriot League. They finished the season 10–18, 5–13 in Patriot League play to finish in a tie for eighth place. They lost in the first round of the Patriot League women's tournament to Holy Cross.

Roster

Schedule

|-
!colspan=9 style=| Non-conference regular season

|-
!colspan=9 style=| Patriot League regular season

|-
!colspan=9 style=| Patriot League Women's Tournament

Rankings
2018–19 NCAA Division I women's basketball rankings

See also
2018–19 Navy Midshipmen men's basketball team

References

Navy
Navy Midshipmen women's basketball seasons
Navy
Navy